Ellis McNatt Jones (born February 25, 1970) is an American sociologist and author at College of the Holy Cross. His research has focused on ethical consumerism, corporate social responsibility, and lifestyle movements. He is best known for his research translating the social and environmental records of companies into an A to F rating system for use by consumers.

Early life and education 

Jones was a Peace Corps Volunteer in the Republic of Panama from 1993 to 1995 where he worked in Environmental Education. He holds a Ph.D. from the University of Colorado and is currently a professor of sociology at College of the Holy Cross.

Work 

Jones has researched consumer products, rating corporations on an "A" through "F" scale based on their scores in five areas: human rights (sweatshops, child labor, etc.), the environment (global warming, rainforest destruction, etc.), animal protection (animal testing, humane treatment, etc.), community involvement (local business support, nonprofit alliances, etc.), and social justice (fair wages, discrimination, etc.). In his book "The Better World Shopping Guide: Every Dollar Makes A Difference," he encourages consumers to push their dollars to the "A" and "B" companies and away from the "D" and "F" companies to create a better world.

Selected bibliography

Books

Chapters in books

Articles

References

Holy Cross faculty list
Jones, Ellis (June 2015). Curriculum Vitae. Via Academia.edu. Accessed 15 December 2016.

External links
Ellis Jones at Academia.edu
Ellis Jones at Google Scholar

1970 births
Living people
American sociologists
Peace Corps volunteers
University of Colorado alumni
College of the Holy Cross faculty